Mother's Army was an American hard rock supergroup founded in 1993.

Their original line-up consisted of vocalist Joe Lynn Turner, guitarist Jeff Watson, bassist Bob Daisley and drummer Carmine Appice. For the last studio album, Aynsley Dunbar took over the drums.

Throughout the five years of its existence, Mother's Army has released three studio albums. The band split up in 1998.

Discography

Studio albums
 Mother's Army (1993)
 Planet Earth (1997)
 Fire on the Moon (1998)

References

Hard rock musical groups from California
Musical groups established in 1993
Musical groups disestablished in 1998
Rock music supergroups
Polydor Records artists